Bryan van Dijk (born 8 February 1981, Amersfoort) is a Dutch judoka.

Achievements

External links
 
 Bryan van Dijk at www.defensie.nl

1981 births
Living people
Dutch male judoka
Sportspeople from Amersfoort
20th-century Dutch people
21st-century Dutch people